Colección Definitiva is a collection from 20 years of singing from Spanish singer-songwriter Alejandro Sanz with WEA Latina. Alejandro's greatest works from Viviendo deprisa (1991) to Paraíso Express (2009) are in this album. Sanz released this album because after 20 years working with WEA Latina, He signed a contract with Universal Music Group. 
"Colección Definitiva" included 4 CD and 1 DVD. On 2 CDs, There are all duets and collaborations sanz made with other artist like Shakira, El Canto Del Loco, Joaquín Sabina, Miguel Bosé and The Corrs. and there is DVD, which includes all Alejandro Sanz's music videos up-to-date with additional content.

Track listing

CD 1 (Grandes Éxitos) 

 Corazón partio
 ¿Lo ves?
 Amiga mía
 Mi soledad y yo
 Mi primera canción
 Y, ¿si fuera ella?
 Quiero morir en tu veneno
 Aquello que me diste
 Si tú me miras
 Viviendo deprisa
 La fuerza del corazón
 Cómo te echo de menos
 Pisando fuerte
 Se le apagó la luz

CD2 (Grandes Éxitos) 

 Looking for Paradise – con Alicia Keys
 Quisiera ser
 A la primera persona
 Te lo agradezco pero no – con Shakira
 No es lo mismo
 Nuestro amor será leyenda
 Cuando nadie me ve
 Try to save your song
 Desde cuando
 Enséñame tus manos
 El alma al aire
 Lola soledad
 Regálame la silla donde te esperé
 Tú no tienes alma
 Sin que se note

CD (Colaboraciones) 

 Shakira – La tortura (2005)
 El canto del loco – Volverá (2009)
 Armando Manzanero – Adoro (2000)
 Miguel Bosé – Hay días
 Paolo Vallesi – Grande (1997)
 Niña Pastori – Cai (2000)
 Raphael – La fuerza del corazón (2008)
 The Corrs – The hardest Day
 Jeros (Los Chichos) – Quiero estar solo (2001)
 Alexandre Pires – Sólo que me falta (2003)
 Malú – El aprendiz (2004)
 Jarabe de Palo – La quiero a morir (2010)
 Homenaje a la música Brasileña. Samba pa ti – Sozinho (2007)

CD (Duetos) 

 Antonio Carmona – Para que tú no llores (2006)
 Vicente Amigo y Enrique Morente – Y será verdad (2009)
 Moncho – Me vestí de silencio (1999)
 Lena – Tu corazón (2006)
 Pepe de Lucía – La vida es un espejo"
 Iván Lins – Llegaste (Vieste) (2010)
 Joaquín Sabina – Lola Soledad (2010)
 Omara Portuondo – Eso (2004)
 Sara Vega – Vuela (2010)
 Juan Habichuela y Ketama – Dale al aire (1999)
 Homenaje a Javier Krahe – Sábanas de seda (2004)
 Tributo a Neruda – Marinero en tierra (2004)
 Vainica Doble – Dame tu amor (1997)

DVD (Videoclips) 

 Pisando fuerte
 Los dos cogidos de la mano
 Como te echo de menos
 Si tu me miras
 La fuerza del corazón
 Mi soledad y yo
 ¿Lo ves?
 Quiero morir en tu veneno
 Aquello que me diste
 Y, ¿si fuera ella?
 Corazón partio
 Amiga mía
 Corazón partio (Latin Remix)
 Cuando nadie me ve
 El alma al aire
 Quisiera ser
 The hardest Day (con The Corrs)
 Una noche (con The Corrs)
 Llega, llego soledad
 Y solo se me ocurre amarte
 Aprendiz
 No es lo mismo
 Try to save your song
 Regálame la silla donde te esperé
 Regálame la silla donde te espere (montaje ASZ)
 He sido tan Feliz contigo
 A la primera persona
 Te los agradezco pero no
 Enséñame tus manos
 Looking for paradise
 Desde cuando
 Nuestro amor será leyenda
 Lola soledad
 Sin que se note (Directo)

Charts

Weekly charts

Year-end charts

Certifications

References

2011 compilation albums
Alejandro Sanz compilation albums